David Hull (born 13 March 1951) is an English former professional rugby league footballer who played in the 1970s and 1980s.

Playing career

World Club Challenge Final appearances
David Hull played  in St. Helens 2-25 defeat by the 1975 NSWRFL season premiers, Eastern Suburbs Roosters in the unofficial 1976 World Club Challenge at Sydney Cricket Ground on Tuesday 29 June 1976.

Challenge Cup Final appearances
David Hull played  in St. Helens' 20-5 victory over Widnes in the 1976 Challenge Cup Final during the 1975–76 season at Wembley Stadium, London on Saturday 8 May 1976, and was an interchange/substitute in the 12-3 victory over Wakefield Trinity in the 1979 Challenge Cup Final during the 1978–79 season at Wembley Stadium, London on Saturday 5 May 1979.

County Cup Final appearances
David Hull played as an interchange/substitute, i.e. number 15, (replacing  Alan Dearden) in Widnes' 30-2 victory over Workington Town in the 1978 Lancashire County Cup Final during the 1978–79 season at Central Park, Wigan on Saturday 7 October 1978, and was an unused(?) interchange/substitute, i.e. number 15, in the 11-0 victory over Workington Town in the 1979 Lancashire County Cup Final during the 1979–80 season at The Willows, Salford on Saturday 8 December 1979.

BBC2 Floodlit Trophy Final appearances
David Hull played left-, i.e. number 4, and scored a try in St. Helens' 22-2 victory over Dewsbury in the 1975 BBC2 Floodlit Trophy Final during the 1975–76 season at Knowsley Road, St. Helens on Tuesday 16 December 1975.

Player's No.6 Trophy/John Player Trophy Final appearances
David Hull played right-, i.e. number 12, in Widnes' 4-9 defeat by Warrington in the 1977–78 Players No.6 Trophy Final during the 1977–78 season at Knowsley Road, St. Helens on Saturday 28 January 1978, played right-, and scored a try in the 16-4 victory over Warrington in the 1978–79 John Player Trophy Final during the 1978–79 season at Knowsley Road, St. Helens on Saturday 28 April 1979, and played right- in the 0-6 defeat by Bradford Northern in the 1979–80 John Player Trophy Final during the 1979–80 season at Headingley Rugby Stadium, Leeds on Saturday 5 January 1980.

References

External links
Profile at saints.org.uk
(archived by web.archive.org) Wakefield Wildcats v London Skolars
Statistics at rugby.widnes.tv

1951 births
Living people
English rugby league players
London Broncos players
Rugby league centres
Rugby league locks
Rugby league players from St Helens, Merseyside
Rugby league second-rows
St Helens R.F.C. players
Widnes Vikings players